The ICD Promaster is an electropneumatic paintball marker manufactured by Indian Creek Designs and first released in 2005. The Promaster was designed to replace the aging Bushmaster 2000 model, which had been Indian Creek Design's flagship marker between 2000 and 2004.

History
The original Promaster was a mechanical blowback paintball marker manufactured by a company called Line SI, which was then partially owned by Jerry Dobbins, the current owner of Indian Creek Designs. It was one of the first stacked-tube semiautomatic designs in paintball in the late 1980s to early 1990s. When ICD set out to redesign the Bushmaster (itself named after Line SI's famous pump) in 2005, the Promaster name was resurrected to help promote the new model. Other than its name, the current Promaster shares nothing in common with the original.

Specifications

The Promaster has a significantly smaller profile than its Bushmaster predecessor. It is an electronic solenoid-actuated computer controlled marker. The major components of the marker are machined from solid aluminum, and then hard anodized. The stock board can operate in semi-automatic mode, ramp automatic, ramp, and ramp burst. All modes can be capped at 15 bit/s (balls per second) or completely uncapped. Modes are selected by changing switches on the circuit board under the marker's grip.

The Promaster comes stock with a 12" ported barrel with Autococker/Intimidator threads. The stock marker also comes with a four-way adjustable aluminum double trigger, electronic break-beam eye, Delrin bolt, and quick pull pins for field stripping.

Designed to operate on low-pressure. The main operating pressure is 250–300 PSI, which can be monitored via the gauge on the primary (input) regulator. The secondary pressure is factory preset and regulated to 85–95 PSI. Gas usage is controlled through these two internal regulators.  is not a recommended propellant for the Promaster or any electropneumatic marker, as the cold liquid  can destroy a solenoid valve. Instead, regulated high pressure air or nitrogen systems are recommended although  may be used if an anti-siphon tube has been installed inside the  bottle.

Since the Promaster is able to reach firing rates of over 15 bit/s (30 bit/s is claimed by Indian Creek), it will operate best when used with a force-fed hopper such as Vlocity/Vlocity Jr, Halo, Empire B, Pulse, Fasta, and or a Dye Rotor. However a force-fed hopper is not absolutely necessary and an agitated, or other electronic hopper, may be used with the Promaster at lower rates of fire (i.e. Viewloader Evolution 2 or 3, Revolutions, Halo TSA Frontman and Backman, Ricochet Apache, etc.)

Upgrades
There are many upgrades available for the Promaster. One upgrade that must be bought immediately is a bottom line setup, the most popular of these being an on/off valve style ASA (air source adaptor) with a macroline hose. Any 45 style grips will fit it and all Autococker/Intimidator barrels will work as well. The feedneck is threaded into the body and can be replaced with any Bushmaster-style feed neck, such as the feednecks manufactured by AKALMP, CCM and ICDU. Another very popular upgrade among Promaster users is the Indian Creek Designs Underground Cylinder Assembly. It consists of a new cylinder and ram unit as well as a quick exhaust valve, or QEV and hose barb. The low pressure regulator pressure can be dropped significantly after this upgrade. This increases the Promaster's air efficiency and cycle speed as well as reducing the amount of recoil felt when firing. Another advantage to adding the ICDU cylinder is the hammer can be removed out of the back of the gun, resulting in an easier maintenance process for the user. Other popular upgrades are replacement high pressure regulators, low pressure regulators and valves that offer higher air flow and consistency, resulting in higher paintball velocities at lower air pressures, thus increasing the Promaster's efficiency. Aftermarket micro-processor circuit boards are available from NOX, Kila Products and Vaporworks. The Promaster shares the same circuit board type as the newer ICD Freestyles. Yet another popular upgrade is widely available on www.ebay.com. It is a Delrin bolt link pin, which links the bolt to the ram hammer. It is very popular because it is light in weight, prevents scratching of the body and, is very inexpensive compared to most other upgrades available for the Promaster. Delrin bolts are also available, however the stock bolt has proven to be a strong point of the gun because it is also made of Delrin and no evidence of performance gains has been shown with the use of an upgraded bolt. New high flow solenoid valves are also available from ICDU website as well as Airsoldier.com

Drawbacks
One of the main drawbacks for buying a Promaster is that it does not come stock with an ASA, which means that the owner will have to add one before he or she uses the marker.

Many users have reported a "break-in" period before the marker performs consistently, as is common in most markers.

The Promaster does not come stock with a clamping feedneck, a device that locks onto a hopper and keeps it more secure than a standard feedneck. This is not a major problem, however; many users upgrade to a clamping feedneck.

Unfortunately ICD products are generally not as readily available as products from more popular paintball companies such as Smart Parts, or Tippmann, etc. This means that replacement or upgrade parts can sometimes be hard to find, particularly for players living outside of the U.S.

Lasoya Promaster

Indian Creek Designs also made a variant of this marker known as the Lasoya Promaster. The Lasoya version has slightly different milling which is more simplistic and comes in a dust finish two tone fade colour. The aggressive "tail" has been removed, perhaps to decrease the weight of the marker. The high pressure regulator is different from the standard Promaster. It is a clone of the well-known Air America Vigilante regulator. Instead of the standard Promaster blade trigger, a new trigger with two finger groves has been added. The bolt is also different as it is made of teflon, instead of Delrin and has a small "ramp" on the top to reduce ball breakage. It also comes with a low pressure regulator gauge so the user can see exactly what the LPR is set at. Another change from the regular Promaster is the feed neck. While it is still not a clamping feed neck, it has a lower profile, resulting in less hopper hits. The board in the Lasoya Promaster was made by Kila products for ICD and is a less adjustable version of their Promaster Drive board. Hence it has been nicknamed the "Kila Lite" board. It features more firing modes than the original Promaster board and an adjustable "debounce" setting.

Like the original, the Lasoya Promaster does not come with an ASA.

The Lasoya finish comes in black/gold, black/blue, black/grey, and black/red.
The Lasoya Promaster is available in limited quantity because shortly after they went into production, the contract between Pat Maroch and NPS was severed, causing the production of more Lasoya Promasters to come to an end.

Other models

Prototypes for a GS Promaster and an ND Promaster were designed but not released. The GS Promaster was designed by ICD tech Greg Schutte. It has the ICD aftermarket cylinder assembly, BlueFork modified stock ICD LPR, HPR, new ICD clamping feedneck, stock grips, Humphrey high-flow solenoid (same solenoid used in the Freestyle pro) and full predator coding v. 5.0. The GS Promaster looks much like the regular Promaster with a different "tail" design. It was going to be produced as a Private Label, but ICD decided not to proceed with the project. Greg Schutte owns the only existing GS Promaster.

The Naughty Dogs Promaster was made for and tested by the Naughty Dogs. Only a couple of these models were made, and the model was not put into production.

External links
Official ICD Promaster Page
Indian Creek Designs Owners Group
Promaster User Reviews
Pbreview Forum Promaster FAQ
Pbnation Forum Promaster FAQ
Pbnation Promaster Video Thread
Bluefork Designs
Vaporworks

Paintball markers